West Branch Caldwell Creek is a  long 2nd order tributary to Caldwell Creek in Warren County, Pennsylvania. It is the only stream of this name in the United States.

Course
West Branch Caldwell Creek rises about 2 miles southeast of Cobbs Corners, Pennsylvania and then flows generally south to join Caldwell Creek about 0.25 miles northeast of Selkirk, Pennsylvania.

Watershed
West Branch Caldwell Creek drains  of area, receives about 44.8 in/year of precipitation, has a wetness index of 422.53, and is about 73% forested.

See also
 List of rivers of Pennsylvania

References

Rivers of Pennsylvania
Rivers of Warren County, Pennsylvania